Dorien Llewellyn (born May 16, 1996) is a Canadian water skier. Llewellyn was the Pan American Games Champion when he won gold in men's water skiing at the 2019 Pan Am Games in Lima. He also owns 21 national water skiing titles to his name. His father Jaret Llewellyn is an 11-time world champion, 12-time Pan American Games medalist, and owns a record 117 professional titles; while his uncle Kreg Llewellyn was also a professional water skier. Llewellyn graduated from Rollins College with a physics degree in 2019. Though the Llewellyn family calls Innisfail, Alberta home, they live and train in Orlando, Florida due to the fact they can train all year in Florida.

References 

1996 births
Living people
Canadian water skiers
Pan American Games gold medalists for Canada
Medalists at the 2019 Pan American Games
Pan American Games medalists in water skiing
Water skiers at the 2019 Pan American Games